John Pepper (c. 1537 – 14 June 1603), of St. Martins, Richmond, Yorkshire, was an English politician.

He was a Member (MP) of the Parliament of England for Richmond, Yorkshire in 1584 and 1593. He was mayor of Richmond in 1586–7 and 1594–5.

References

1537 births
1603 deaths
People from Richmond, North Yorkshire
English MPs 1584–1585
English MPs 1593
Mayors of Richmond, North Yorkshire